John Timothy Whitney (14 December 1945 – 15 December 1990), known also as Tim Whitney, was an expert on British postmarks who wrote a popular catalogue on the subject that has been through many editions, and the definitive guide to the stamps and postal history of the Isle of Man. He was also an expert on the philately of the French coastal islands.

Tim obtained a degree in theology from Oxford University and in 1975 a Ph.D. from Nottingham University.
 
He ran the religious studies department at South East Essex Sixth Form College for many years.

He had suffered from muscular dystrophy since his teens and was an active fundraiser for MD causes. He died in Southend-On-Sea, Essex, the day after his 45th birthday.

Selected publications
 Collect British Postmarks. 4th edition. Benfleet, Essex: J.T. Whitney, 1987. 
 Isle of Man Handbook of Stamps and Postal History. Chippenham, Wiltshire: Picton Publishing & B.P.H. Publications Ltd., 1981 , 309p.

References

1945 births
1990 deaths
Alumni of the University of Oxford
British philatelists
People with muscular dystrophy
People from Leeds
Schoolteachers from Essex